Schnack is a word from Low German which refers to a chat or in derogative meaning a gossip.

Schnack is a surname. Notable people with the name include:

A. J. Schnack, American documentary filmmaker
Anton Schnack (1892–1973), German writer
Larry G. Schnack, American academic
Yasmin Schnack (born 1988), American tennis player

See also
C.A. Schnack Jewelry Company Store, Commercial buildings on the National Register of Historic Places in Louisiana